Sclerotic fibromas are a cutaneous condition characterized by well-circumscribed, dome-shaped, dermal hypocellular nodules composed predominantly of sclerotic thick collagen bundles.

See also 
 Blepharochalasis
 List of cutaneous conditions
 List of cutaneous neoplasms associated with systemic syndromes

References 

Abnormalities of dermal fibrous and elastic tissue